Charles Foster (September 2, 1823 – May 23, 1877) was an American lawyer and politician.

Foster, son of Nathaniel and Elizabeth Foster, was born in Lansingburgh, Rensselaer County, N. Y., September 2, 1823.  In 1836, his parents removed to Pompey, Onondaga County, where he was prepared for College.  He graduated from Yale College in 1844.  He studied law successively with Hon. Victor Birdseye, of Pompey, Hon. B. D. Noxon, of Syracuse, and Hon. John Van Buren, of Albany. In October, 1847, he was admitted to the bar, but on account of health was advised to try a more active life, and occupied himself in the cattle-trade, until January, 1853, when he began practice as a lawyer in Cortland, N. Y., where he remained until his death. He was in partnership with R. H. Duell, from January, 1857, till 1874, when failing health compelled him to give up his profession. He had been for some years subject to pulmonary difficulties, and spent the three succeeding winters in Washington, but without any marked improvement. From November, 1875, to February, 1877, he was employed as an examiner in the U. S. Patent Office. He died, of consumption, in Cortland, May 23, 1877, aged 53 years.  Besides local offices of trust and honor, the only public position which he filled was that of member of the New York State Assembly in 1870.

He was married, Oct. 13, 1853, to Jane M., daughter of Richard G. Fowler, of Cortland, who survived him. They had no children.

Sources

1823 births
1877 deaths
People from Lansingburgh, New York
Yale College alumni
New York (state) lawyers
Members of the New York State Assembly
People from Cortland, New York
19th-century American politicians
19th-century American lawyers